Brian Gutiérrez (born June 17, 2003) is an American professional soccer player who plays as an attacking midfielder for Major League Soccer club Chicago Fire.

Club career
Born in Berwyn, Illinois, Gutiérrez began his career with the Chicago Fire youth academy in 2015. On March 9, 2020, Gutiérrez signed a homegrown player deal with the club's first team in Major League Soccer.

Gutiérrez made his professional debut for the Chicago Fire on August 20, 2020, against Columbus Crew, coming on as an 82nd-minute substitute in a 3–0 defeat.

International career
Gutiérrez has played for the U.S. youth national teams at multiple levels, including the Under-20 level. He was also in consideration for the USMNT's senior camp in December 2021.

Personal life
Born in the United States, Gutiérrez is of Mexican descent.

Career statistics

Club

References

External links
 Profile at Chicago Fire

2003 births
Living people
People from Berwyn, Illinois
American soccer players
Association football midfielders
Chicago Fire FC players
Major League Soccer players
Soccer players from Illinois
American sportspeople of Mexican descent
United States men's under-20 international soccer players
Homegrown Players (MLS)